The Jaguar R3 is a Formula One racing car with which Jaguar Racing competed in the 2002 Formula One season. The car was launched on 4 January 2002. It was driven by Eddie Irvine and Pedro de la Rosa, both retained from 2001. A "B Specification" car named the Jaguar R3B made her debut at the 2002 British Grand Prix and used for the remainder of the 2002 season.

After the disappointing past two seasons, 2002 was even worse for Jaguar. The team admitted to making a lot of mistakes especially in the wind tunnel, as its calculations were wrong. After a fortuitous fourth place at the attritional Australian GP, the car's poor reliability and lack of horsepower began to show and the team slipped down the rankings; however, towards the end of the season updates were brought in and the car began to improve, culminating in Irvine scoring the team's final podium finish at Monza.

The team finished 7th in the Constructors' Championship, with eight points, all scored by Irvine.

One of the R3s is still driven in competition regularly, by Riccardo Ponzio, in BOSS GP, who is competing in the 2021 season in the Open class. Ponzio continues to compete in 2022, although he drives in the F1 Class.

Sponsors
HSBC
Beck's
AT&T
EDS
DuPont
HP
Castrol
Lear
3D Systems
Aqua-Pura
Rolex
Oliver

Complete Formula One results
(key)

References

Jaguar Formula One cars